The Juventus F.C.–S.S.C. Napoli rivalry, is an inter-city football rivalry contested between Turin-based Juventus and Naples-based Napoli.

History 
The rivalry between Juventus and Napoli stems from a historical regional rivalry between Northern Italy and Southern Italy, of which the clubs' respective home cities of Turin and Naples are major metropolitan and economic centers. The rivalry started to gain more attention in the 1980s when Napoli became league contenders.

Juventus won the 1985–86 Serie A title with star player Michel Platini, six points clear of third placed Napoli. The following season, Napoli won their first scudetto with star player Diego Maradona, three points ahead of second placed Juventus, the first – and only – Southern Italian team to win the league. Napoli won another, and final title in 1989–90. After that time, in the 1990s, Juventus shared success with Milan in regards to scudetti, as Napoli started to decline.

In 1997–98, Napoli were relegated to Serie B after winning only two matches. By August 2004, Napoli was declared bankrupt. Film producer Aurelio De Laurentiis refounded Napoli under the name "Napoli Soccer", and were placed in the 2004–05 Serie C1. The following season, they secured promotion to Serie B and De Laurentiis bought back the name "Società Sportiva Calcio Napoli" in May 2006. After one season back in Serie B, Napoli were promoted to Serie A, along with that season's Serie B champions, Juventus, after the bianconeri had been relegated the previous season and had their two most recent league titles stripped because of involvement in the Calciopoli scandal.

The rivalry again intensified in the 2010s with Napoli's 2–0 win over Juventus in the 2012 Coppa Italia Final, Juventus captain Alessandro Del Piero's last game for Juventus. Between 2011–12 and 2016–17, Juventus won each league title, with Napoli finishing in at least the top five in each of the seasons. The summer before the 2016–17 season, Argentine forward Gonzalo Higuaín became the third highest football transfer of all-time and highest ever transfer for an Italian club, when he was signed by Juventus for €90 million from Napoli. Higuaín jerseys were burned in the streets of Naples. Since Higuaín joined Juventus in 2016, Napoli fans are not allowed to travel to Turin for Juventus match-ups and vice versa. That season, Juventus paid many fines and had a partial stadium ban because of the repeated chant: 'Vesuvius wash them with lava.' On 22 April 2018, Napoli fans were allowed to travel to Turin, but not those from the Campania region of Italy, where Naples is located. Napoli won the match 1–0 with a 90th-minute header from Kalidou Koulibaly to close the gap to one point behind Juventus in the league table. Despite this, Juventus ended up winning the 2017–18 title, four points ahead of second placed Napoli, extending their record-breaking run of consecutive championships to seven.

Official matches 
 SF = Semi-final
 QF = Quarter-final
 R16 = Round of 16
 R32 = Round of 32
 GS = Group stage
 R1 = Round 1
 R2 = Round 2
 R3 = Round 3

Head-to-head ranking in Serie A (1930–2022)

• Total: Napoli with 12 higher finishes, Juventus with 64 higher finishes (as of the end of the 2021–22 season). 

Notes:
 Both teams qualified for the final round of 8 teams in 1946

Statistics

Trophies

References

Juventus F.C.
S.S.C. Napoli
Italian football derbies
Football in Turin
Football in Naples
1926 establishments in Italy